Rogatus was a Roman masculine given name, particularly common in Roman North Africa.

It may refer to:

 St Rogatus, one of the Martyrs of Abitinae (comm. Feb 12) during the Diocletianic Persecution
 Other SS Rogatus, martyrs commemorated on Jan 12, Mar 28, Aug 17, and Dec 1
 Rogatus or Rogas, father of Fabia Eudokia, wife of the emperor Heraclius
 Rogatus, father of StPaula in late antiquity
 Rogatus, bishop of Cartennae in late antiquity and founder of the Rogatist schism or heresy
 Rogatus, bishop of Parthenia in late antiquity